Dixon House is a historic home located at Poughkeepsie, Dutchess County, New York.  It was built between 1862 and 1867, and is a -story, Gothic Revival style frame dwelling. It features pointed arched windows, a projecting bay, and two-bay front porch with curved brackets and square columns.

It was listed on the National Register of Historic Places in 1982.

References

Houses on the National Register of Historic Places in New York (state)
Gothic Revival architecture in New York (state)
Houses completed in 1867
Houses in Dutchess County, New York
National Register of Historic Places in Poughkeepsie, New York